Wu Ming-hsun (born 15 June 1968) is a Taiwanese swimmer. He competed at the 1984 Summer Olympics and the 1988 Summer Olympics.

References

External links
 

1968 births
Living people
Taiwanese male swimmers
Olympic swimmers of Taiwan
Swimmers at the 1984 Summer Olympics
Swimmers at the 1988 Summer Olympics
Place of birth missing (living people)